The President’s Award for the Environment was established in 2006 by the Ministry of Sustainability and the Environment.

The Award recognizes and honours individuals, organizations and companies which have contributed to Singapore's efforts in achieving environmental sustainability, and is presented by the President of Singapore at the Istana.

Award Recipients 

2006
 Tommy Koh
 Geh Min
 Waterways Watch Society (WWS)

2007
 Tan Gee Paw
 Leo Tan
 City Developments Limited

2008
 Alexandra Hospital
 Senoko Power Limited
 South West Community Development Council

2009
 Commonwealth Secondary School
 National Youth Achievement Award Council
 ST Microelectronics

2010
 Hitachi Global Storage Technologies (GST) Singapore Pte Ltd
 Nan Hua High School
 Singapore Polytechnic

2011
 Dr Tan Wee Kiat of National Parks Board
 SMRT Corporation
 Woodgrove Secondary School

2012
 HSBC Singapore
 Marsiling Secondary School
 Panasonic Asia Pacific

2013
 Dunman High School
 Fuhua Primary School
 Siloso Beach Resort

2014
 Eugene Heng
 Institute of Technical Education
 Ngee Ann Polytechnic

2015
 Kwek Leng Joo
 Kirtida Mekani (Mrs)
 East View Primary School
 Systems on Silicon Manufacturing Company (SSMC)

2016
 Marsiling Primary School
 Bukit View Secondary School
 Ricoh Asia Pacific Pte Ltd (Ricoh)

2017
 Shawn Kaihekulani Yamauchi Lum (Dr)
 Khoo Teck Puat Hospital
 Anchor Green Primary School
2019
 Elias Park Primary School
 Mee Toh School
 Singtel

See also

 List of environmental awards

References

External links
 President's Award for the Environment Official Website
 Recognition Programmes for 3P (People, Public & Private) Partners 
 Nominations open for President's Award for the Environment
 New book on green revolution
Environmental awards